Sar Asiab-e Shesh (also Romanized as Sar Āsīab-e Shesh, Sar Asīab-e Shesh, and Sar Āsyāb-e Shesh; also known as Sar Āsīāb, Sar Āsīāb-e Shesh Farsangī, Sar Āsīyāb, and Sar-i-Āsiāb) is a village in Moezziyeh Rural District, Chatrud District, Kerman County, Kerman Province, Iran. At the 2006 census, its population was 1,968, in 546 families.

References 

Populated places in Kerman County